Street's Disciples is an album released by Gospel Gangstaz.

Official Track listing
 Active
 White T's
 Listen To Da Gun
 Late Night
 Hip Hop Hostage
 Catchin The Chain
 Gangsta Chronicles (Life of a G)

References

Gospel Gangstaz albums
2011 albums